The 2007 Vuelta a Burgos was the 29th edition of the Vuelta a Burgos road cycling stage race, which was held from 14 August to 18 August 2007. The race started in Miranda de Ebro and finished in Burgos. The race was won by Mauricio Soler of the  team.

General classification

References

Vuelta a Burgos
2007 in road cycling
2007 in Spanish sport